Roller Coaster is the 2006 album by Osaka all-female band Red Bacteria Vacuum.

Track listing
"Roller Coaster"
"Nightmare"
"I'm Just A Breast Girl"
"Gimme Culture"
"No-Ten Fuck!!"
"Standing Here..."

2006 albums